Curio muirii is a succulent plant in the family Asteraceae that is native to South Africa.

Description
A small subshrub growing in shale cliffs, it features hairless leaves that are pale green with blueish tones. The leaves are flat and ovate-shaped.

References

muirii
Flora of Southern Africa
Garden plants of Southern Africa
Taxa named by Louisa Bolus